Henry Hussey Vivian, 1st Baron Swansea (6 July 1821 – 28 November 1894), known between May 1882 and June 1893 as Sir Hussey Vivian, 1st Baronet, was a Welsh industrialist and politician from the Vivian family.

Biography

Born at Singleton Abbey, Swansea, Henry was the eldest son of industrialist and MP John Henry Vivian and his wife Sarah, daughter of Arthur Jones, of Reigate. His younger brothers were Arthur Vivian (who would become an industrialist and MP), Richard Glynn Vivian (afterwards an art collector and philanthropist) and Graham Vivian. His uncle was Richard Hussey Vivian, first baron Vivian. He was educated at Eton and studied metallurgy in Germany and France from 1838 before entering Trinity College, Cambridge in 1839.

After two years he became manager of the Liverpool branch of the copper-smelting business founded by his grandfather, Vivian & Sons.  Three years later he became a partner of the firm before coming to Swansea to manage the Hafod Works during the last ten years of his father's life (1845–1855).  He developed a range of by-products from copper-smelting and diversified into other metallurgical activities.  He is credited with originating the "sliding scale" of miners' wages after the strike of 1889, though other authorities attribute the idea to William Thomas Lewis, afterwards Lord Merthyr.  He was one of the chief promoters of the Rhondda and Swansea Bay Railway, helped to further extend the harbour facilities of the town and championed the merits of Welsh coal in Parliamentary debates.  It was largely due to his efforts that Swansea became a major industrial centre.

He served as a Member of Parliament (MP) for Truro (1852–57), Glamorganshire (1857–85), and Swansea District, 1885–93. 

In 1889, he became the first chairman of the Glamorgan County Council. He was also a Justice of the Peace, Deputy Lieutenant for Glamorgan and for some years first Lieutenant-Colonel of the 4th Glamorgan Rifle Volunteers.

He was created a baronet of Singleton, in the Parish of Swansea in the County of Glamorgan, on 13 May 1882, and Baron Swansea, of Singleton in the County of Glamorgan, on 9 June 1893.

After his death on 28 November 1894, probate was granted to his sons Henry Hussey Vivian and Odo Richard Vivian valuing his estate at £163,707 1s 9d, he was buried in the churchyard of St Paul's Church in Sketty. There is a bronze statue of Henry wearing a frock coat and gown in St. David's Shopping Centre, Swansea, created by Italian sculptor Mario Raggi. There is also a plaque at St John's Church in Hafod. It was erected by his widow and contains the words 'Life's race well run. Life's work well done. Life's crown well won. Then comes rest'.

Lord Swansea's younger brother Sir Arthur Vivian was also a Liberal politician.

Marriages and children
Lord Swansea married, on 15 April 1847, to Jessie Dalrymple Goddard (c. 1825 – 28 February 1848), the daughter of Ambrose Goddard, of the Lawn, Swindon. His wife died of childbed fever a few weeks after the birth of their only child.

 Ernest Ambrose Vivian, 2nd Baron Swansea (11 February 1848 – 17 July 1922); died unmarried

On 14 July 1853, he married Lady Flora Caroline Elizabeth Cholmeley (died 25 January 1868), daughter of Sir Montague Cholmeley, 2nd Baronet. They had one son;

 The Hon. John Aubrey Vivian (23 July 1854 – 1 March 1898); died unmarried

Lord Swansea took as his third wife, on 10 November 1870, Averil Beaumont (1841 – 14 January 1934), daughter of Capt. Richard Beaumont, R.N., and granddaughter of the 3rd Baron Macdonald of Slate. He and his third wife had seven children;

 Violet Averil Margaret Vivian (3 December 1871 – 30 March 1943)
 Henry Hussey Vivian (5 February 1873 – 11 December 1898); died unmarried
 Odo Richard Vivian, 3rd Baron Swansea (22 April 1875 – 16 November 1934)
 Averil Vivian (4 December 1876 – 1 February 1959); married George Tryon, 1st Baron Tryon
 Alexandra Gladys Vivian (c. 1879 – 17 July 1966)
 Alberta Diana Vivian (10 February 1883 – 1968)
 a daughter (10 February 1883)

References

Further reading

External links

Swansea, Henry Vivian, 1st Baron
Swansea, Henry Vivian, 1st Baron
People educated at Eton College
British industrialists
Liberal Unionist Party MPs for Welsh constituencies
Leaders of local authorities of Wales
Politicians from Swansea
Swansea, Henry Vivian, 1st Baron
Whig (British political party) MPs for English constituencies
Members of the Parliament of the United Kingdom for constituencies in Cornwall
Liberal Party (UK) MPs for Welsh constituencies
History of Swansea
Politicians from Cornwall
UK MPs 1852–1857
UK MPs 1857–1859
UK MPs 1859–1865
UK MPs 1865–1868
UK MPs 1868–1874
UK MPs 1874–1880
UK MPs 1880–1885
UK MPs 1885–1886
UK MPs 1886–1892
UK MPs 1892–1895
UK MPs who were granted peerages
Members of Glamorgan County Council
Henry
Welsh justices of the peace
Members of the Parliament of the United Kingdom for Swansea constituencies
Peers of the United Kingdom created by Queen Victoria
19th-century British businesspeople